Rathangan Castle was a castle in Rathangan in County Kildare, Ireland. Built by the O’ Connors, the castle was demolished in the 18th century.

Castles in County Kildare